Stephanie van Willigenburg is a professor of mathematics at the University of British Columbia whose research is in the field of algebraic combinatorics and concerns quasisymmetric functions. Together with James Haglund, Kurt Luoto and Sarah Mason, she introduced the quasisymmetric Schur functions, which form a basis for quasisymmetric functions.

Education
Van Willigenburg earned her Ph.D. in 1997 at the University of St. Andrews under the joint supervision of Edmund F. Robertson and Michael D. Atkinson, with a thesis titled The Descent Algebras of Coxeter Groups.

Recognition
Van Willigenburg was awarded the Krieger–Nelson Prize in 2017 by the Canadian Mathematical Society. She was named to the 2023 class of Fellows of the American Mathematical Society, "for contributions to algebraic combinatorics, mentorship and exposition, and inclusive community building".

Selected publications

References

External links

Year of birth missing (living people)
Living people
Academic staff of the University of British Columbia
Canadian women mathematicians
20th-century Canadian mathematicians
21st-century Canadian mathematicians
Combinatorialists
20th-century women mathematicians
21st-century women mathematicians
20th-century Canadian women scientists
Fellows of the American Mathematical Society